The Vancouver Amazons were a women's ice hockey team from the 1920s. They were the first women's hockey team from Vancouver to participate in the invitational women's hockey tournament sponsored by the Banff Winter Carnival. The Amazons competed in 1921. The Amazons qualified for the final that year but were defeated. The team was owned by Frank Patrick, who also owned the Vancouver Millionaires. Patrick would organize a tournament featuring the Amazons, the Seattle Vamps and the Victoria Kewpies. The Amazons went undefeated in the tournament and did not allow a goal. The Amazons were West Coast Women's champions. As the tournament featured a team from the United States, many consider this the first ever international women's hockey competition.

At the Banff tournament in 1922, Elizabeth Hinds became the first woman from British Columbia to score a hat trick in a game. Phebe Senkler was captain of the Amazons and her sister Norah played on defense. The forwards were Kathleen Carson and Nan Griffith, while the goaltender was Amelia Voitkevic. The bench featured Lorraine Cannon and Mayme Leahy. The Amazons qualified for the 1922 final and played the Calgary Regents. In the third period, the Amazons were down 1–0, and Kathleen Carson tied the game. Carson would score the game-winning goal in overtime and were awarded the Alpine Club Cup.

Second team
The new version of the Vancouver Amazons was founded in 1931. The club was organized by competitive speed skater Doris Parkes. Former Fernie Swastikas player Belva Graves was now a member of the team.

References

Women's ice hockey teams in Canada
Defunct ice hockey teams in Canada
Ice hockey teams in Vancouver
Women in Vancouver